Doctor and the Medics is a British glam rock band formed in London in 1981. The group was most successful during the 1980s and is best known for their cover of Norman Greenbaum's "Spirit in the Sky" which reached No. 1 in the UK Singles Chart. The band currently performs with a newer and established line-up. As well as previously being classed a tribute act to various artists, they include many of their original songs in their live set. The group's musical style includes neo-psychedelia, glam rock, new wave and pop rock.

Career
The Doctor and the Medics lead singer – Clive Jackson, born 7 July 1961 in Knotty Ash, Liverpool– a former London-based DJ, formed the group in 1981 with guitarist Steve McGuire, drummer Vom, also known as Steve Ritchie, bassist Richard Searle and female dancers and singers The Anadin Brothers. The group adopted a look inspired by both 1960s psychedelia and kabuki make-up similar to that of Kiss.

Their first single was "The Druids Are Here" which was released on Whaam Records in 1982. They released no further records until 1985, but a four-track EP recorded live at Alice in Wonderland, a Soho nightclub where The Doctor was house DJ, was available direct from the band. The band's female backing singers, known as The Anadin Brothers, were originally three in number, but reduced to two members - Wendi West and Colette Appleby.

In 1985, they signed to IRS Records and released "Happy but Twisted", a five track 12" EP including a cover of Hawkwind's "Silver Machine". This reached number 2 on the indie charts. It was followed by "The Miracle of the Age", produced by Andy Partridge of XTC. Around this time the band performed a concert in a television studio in Limehouse, London was recorded for television broadcast, although it was not shown at the time. At this concert the line-up was augmented by Roman Jugg of The Damned on keyboards and second guitar.

In 1986 the band had an international hit with their next single, a cover of Norman Greenbaum's "Spirit in the Sky". The single reached number one in the UK. Their subsequent singles were less successful; "Burn" and "Waterloo" (the latter of which was a cover of the ABBA hit, with Roy Wood on saxophone, backing vocals and in the video). "Burn" reached number 29 in the UK Singles Chart and "Waterloo" reached number 45. The band released their final studio album Instant Heaven, in 1996 on their own 'Madman' record label.

In the early 2000s, the band's current line-up appeared on retro-themed British TV shows such as ITV1's Hit Me Baby One More Time, and a Top of the Pops Christmas special celebrating 50 years of the UK Singles Chart. In June 2006, the band appeared, with a new line-up, on Channel 4's Bring Back One Hit Wonders. Around this time they released an EP called Timewarped. They continue to perform live.

Personnel
1981 line-up
 The Doctor (Clive Jackson) (vocals)
 Steve McGuire (guitar)
 Richard Searle (bass)
 Andrew McLachlan (drums)

1986 line-up
 The Doctor (vocals)
 Steve McGuire (guitar)
 Richard Searle (bass)
 Steve "Vom" Ritchie (drums)
 Wendi Anadin (vocals)
 Colette Anadin (vocals)

Richard Searle left in 1990 shortly after Vom Ritchie departed. Gareth Thomas replaced Searle in 1990. Searle went on to form the acid jazz band Corduroy, with former members of Sire Records act Boys Wonder.
Since leaving the Medics, drummer Ritchie has played with Last of the Teenage Idols, Stiv Bators, B-Bang Cider, The Boys, Wet Dog and now plays with Die Toten Hosen.

2003 reunion line-up
 The Doctor (vocals)
 Adrian Hill (drums)
 Carl Axon (The Big Bopper) (lead guitar, backing vocals)
 James Hartley (guitar)
 Jon Randle (bass)
 Melissa Weekes (backing vocals)
 Colette Anadin (backing vocals)
 Paul Nevin (performance artist)

Carl Axon left to pursue business interests.

Current line-up
 The Doctor (vocals)
 Adrian Hill (drums)
 Dan Angelow (guitar)
 Jon Randle (bass)
 Melissa Weekes (vocals)
 Matthew Angelow (guitar/performance artist)
 Maria Verhelst-Hopkins (vocals/performance artist)

Discography

Albums

Singles

EPs
 Happy But Twisted EP (1985), Illegal - UK Indie No. 2 UK Singles Chart No. 151
 (Happy Side: "Happy But Twisted"/"Round and Round"/"Auntie Evil's Dormitory")
 (Twisted Side: "Mole Catcher" / "Silver Machine")
 Two Pieces of Cloth Carefully Stitched Together (1987), Illegal - UK Indie No. 34
 (Before Side: "Sound of Chains" / "Perfect World")
 (After Side: "Silver King" / "Age of Gold")
 Timewarped (2006) – 6-track covers EP

Music videos
 "Spirit in the Sky" (1986)
 "Burn" (1986)
 "Waterloo" (1986)
 "More" (1987)
 "Burning Love" (1987)

Other appearances
 Phantasmagoria (album) - The Damned (1985), MCA Records
 (features the song "Grimly Fiendish", co-written with The Doctor)
 Live at the Alice & Wonderland: A Pretty Smart Way to Catch a Lobster (1986), Flicknife Records (re-issued by Madman for CD)
 (features the band as 'Gwyllym & the Raspberry Flavoured Cat' performing "These Boots Are Made for Walking" (Live) and "Gloria" (Live) and some DJ links by The Doctor)
 "Let It Be" / "Let It Be (The Gospel Jam Mix)" - Ferry Aid (1987), The Sun
 (12" version: "Let It Be" / "Let It Be (Mega Message Mix)", contains a message from The Doctor and the Anadin Brothers)

See also
 Reading and Leeds Festivals line-ups

References

External links
 
 
 

English psychedelic rock music groups
English glam rock groups
English new wave musical groups
I.R.S. Records artists
Musical groups established in 1981
Musical groups from London